Jiangjin District, one of the districts in the southwest of Chongqing, China, lies along the upper reaches of Yangtze River, and has a history extending back more than 1500 years. The district covers 3200 square kilometres and has a population of 1,460,000, and borders the provinces of Sichuan to the southwest and Guizhou to the south.

Administrative divisions
Jiangjin District administers 25 townships and 5 subdistricts.

History
Jiangjin enjoys a history of more than 1500 years. Established in 487 C. E., Jiangzhou County was renamed Jiangyang County in 557 C. E. and renamed Jiangyang County in 583 C. E. In 1983, Jiangjin County placed under the administration of Chongqing city. In 1992, the Jiangjin County was promoted to a county-level city. In 2006, the status of Jiangjin county-level city was changed to Jiangjin District, a district of Chongqing.

Geographical setting
Jiangjin lies within central China at 105°49′—106°38′of longitude and 28°28′—29°28′of north latitude. The landscape and topography of Jiangjin slopes from high elevations in the south and low in the north. Luohuangzhongba stands at the lowest elevation (178.5 m). The highest site, Wugongba in Simian Mountain, reaches an elevation of 1709.4 m. The average elevation of downtown Jiangjin is 209.7 m, with a flood stage designated at an elevation of 199.13 m.

Climate and weather

Transportation
At present, six national-level highways provide transportation corridors to Jiangjin. For example, both the Chengdu-Chongqing and Yuqin freeways serve to ease traffic problems in Jiangjin. The Luohuang Yangtse River Railway Bridge and Jiangjin Yangtze River Bridge provide convenient access to Jiangjin.
Jiangjin District is well connected to the Chongqing city center via three major highway. Just 50 mins drive from Chongqing Jiangbei International Airport to Jiangjin.

Chongqing Rail Transit
Jiangjin District is served by Jiangtiao line of Chongqing Rail Transit.

Economy
Jiangjin, as one of several citrus producing areas in China, has a long history of citrus cultivation. The 'Jincheng' orange originated here. Major agricultural products include rice, wheat, soybean, sweet potato, pepper corn, vegetables and fruits. Animal husbandry includes pig farms and fisheries.

In 2006, the total annual GDP was CNY14.894 billion and the annual average income per copita is CNY10,458 in Jangjin. It posted the 7th highest GDP in 2016. Zhiping country is the key focus of high end development in 2017. Large Chinese residential developers were turned away without an exciting development proposal despite offering high RMB2m per acre. Third Communist Liberation Army will be relocated to Zhiping with a massive 1500 acres of land, providing medical services, military training and housing facilities for high-ranking military officers and families.

Tourism

One of the tourist attractions in Jiangjin District, Simian Mountain, is known for its natural environment, forests, lakes, rivers and waterfalls.
Another tourist attraction is the Zhongshan Ancient Town, with a historical record of its existence dating 850 or so years back to the Song Dynasty.
A more recent tourist attraction is Aiqing Tianti, a mountain path with 6,000 steps built by Liu Guogang for his wife Xu Zhaoqing. The path is seen as a symbol of dedication and love between Liu and Xu and tourists visit the path to their secluded home.

Special Local Products
Jiangjin is known for its production of Laobaigan, a strong limpid liquor usually with an alcohol level of near or above 60 proof. Mihuatang, sweet and crisp dessert produced in Jiangjin, is mainly made of puffed rice and sesame.

Sister city

See also
Chongqing

Notes

External links
Government website of Jiangjin

Districts of Chongqing